CIVA may refer to:

 Charge induced voltage alteration a technique which uses a scanning electron microscope to locate open conductors on CMOS integrated circuits
 CIVA-TV, a television transmitter in Canada which airs the Télé-Québec program schedule
 Fédération Aéronautique Internationale Aerobatics Commission, also known as the "Commission Internationale de Voltige Aerienne"
 C.I.V.A, a South Korean girl group